Mambetovo (Mämbät) is a rural locality (a village) in Makansky Selsoviet, Khaybullinsky District, Bashkortostan, Russia. The population was 529 as of 2010. There are 7 streets.

Geography 
Mambetovo is located 25 km east of Akyar (the district's administrative centre) by road. Sagitovo is the nearest rural locality.

References 

Rural localities in Khaybullinsky District